The Caproni Ca.313 was an Italian twin-engine reconnaissance bomber of the late-1930s. It was a development of the Ca.310. Its variants were exported to several other countries.

Design and development
The Ca.313 was designed by Cesare Pallavicino. The prototype first flew on 22 December 1939.  It was developed as a replacement of the Caproni Ca.311.

To save development time, the first Ca.313 was simply a modified Ca.310 with new engines. The final Ca.313 design was similar to the Ca.311 with inline engines. These engines, IF Delta RC 35 inverted V-12s, had a smaller frontal profile than the Piaggio P.VII C.35 radial engines they replaced. Due to the resulting lower aerodynamic drag, the Ca.313 was capable of more speed for the same power. Given the fact that 626 kW (840 hp) Fiat A.38 radial engines were needed for frontline fighters, there was no other choice for this aircraft.

The Ca.313 had a glassed-in nose, similar to the Heinkel He 111. This Caprioni, with its characteristic 'Z' hubs, engines mounted in the wings and retractable undercarriage, was of mixed construction, i.e. metal in the fuselage and wood in the wings.
 
Bomb load and defensive armament were typical of the time. The aircraft could carry 400 kg (880 lb) of bombs. Three 7.7 mm (0.303 mm) Breda (or two 12.7 mm Scotti) machine guns were fitted – one in the left wing, one in a dorsal turret and one in the ventral position.

The main customer was the Regia Aeronautica (Italian Air Force), but many aircraft were ordered by other countries. France ordered 200 machines and Great Britain 300. Of these 500, only five Ca.313F units were delivered to France before Italy's entry into World War II.

Operational history
The aircraft served mainly with Italy, in the light transport, trainer and maritime reconnaissance roles. Swedish Air Force designations were B 16, S 16, T 16, and Tp 16.

The outbreak of war greatly affected Sweden's military buildup, as the USA stopped deliveries of hundreds of new US aircraft to Sweden (among them 60 P-35A and 144 P-66 Vanguards). Only 62 other airplanes had been delivered before the embargo took effect. To complete its war preparations, Sweden searched for other sources, eventually ordering 84 of the Caproni Ca.313S, 72 of the Fiat CR.42, and 60 of the Reggiane Re.2000, an order totaling some 90 million kronor.

The aircraft were delivered between 1940 and 1941. Between 1940 and 1943, there were 23 fatal accidents at the three air force bases (F 3, F 7 and F 11) that operated them. Three more were shot down by German fighters, on 18 and 23 May 1944. 41 crewmen died in these 'flying coffins'. The Ca.313 suffered many engine fires; this situation was not helped by the special fuel called Bentol,  containing alcohol, that was used due to fuel shortage in Sweden because of the war. This fuel often dissolved the coating of the floats made of cork and also corroded the fuel tanks, causing leaks which would result in the fuel spilling onto the hot engines.

Other accidents occurred when the aircraft was used in a role for which it was not suited, such as dive bombing. For example, on 10 June 1942, one aircraft crashed following a wing failure. Many parts were not made to the correct standard. When it was realized that Sweden did not have the same accident problem, a modification programme was introduced and the rate of accidents dropped. For many years this machine, with its ten-hour endurance, was the only one capable of patrolling around Sweden. By all standards, it was obsolete by 1940. It was removed from service soon after the end of the war.

The Luftwaffe eventually ordered 905 machines called the CA.313G to be used for training purposes and other secondary employment, but only 117 planes were delivered. They had a different nose from the standard model. Two series of Ca.313 had this nose difference and were called 'Ca.313 R.P.B.1 and 2.

In 1942, Croatia received ten Caproni Ca 311M bombers which had been ordered and paid for by the former Royal Yugoslav government.

Variants
Ca.312 An enhanced Ca.310 with inline engines. Sold to Norway.
Ca.313 Prototype A Ca.310 airframe with inline engines in place of previous radial engines.
Ca.313 Production Improved derivative of Ca.310 with inline engines.
Ca.313S Production Export model Ca.313 for Sweden with 84 aircraft made and delivered in three batches.

Swedish variants
Swedish Ca.313s were armed with one 13.2mm m/39 cannon in each wingroot and had 8mm m/22s in the turret and for the ventral gunner.
B 16A Bomber variant. Had an internal bomb capacity of 500 kg and external bomb capacity of 400 kg with a total capacity of 800 kg. It was used as a dive bomber.
S 16A Reconnaissance variant.
T 16A Torpedo variant. Due to bad craftsmanship they were never used as torpedo bombers but were converted to reconnaissance planes.
S 16B Designation for T 16s converted to reconnaissance planes.
TP 16 Transport aircraft.

Operators

 Air Force of the Independent State of Croatia
 
 French Air Force - Five Ca 313F aircraft
 
 Luftwaffe
 
 Regia Aeronautica

Italian Air Force
 
 Norwegian Army Air Service
 
 Swedish Air Force

Planned

Belgian Air Force 24 Ca.312 were ordered in 1940, none could be delivered before the Fall of Belgium.

Royal Air Force 300 Ca 313s and 300 Re 2000s were ordered in January 1940, but the orders were cancelled when Italy entered the war in June 1940.

Surviving aircraft
There are no original Ca.313 survivors. A full size replica built in Sweden for a TV miniseries using some original parts was put in the Flygvapenmuseum, Linköping after filming was completed. It can still be seen in that location.

Specifications (Ca.313)

References

Sources
Alonzo, F.S, "Il Caproni Ca.313 in Svezia", Storia militare  n. 64, page 15.

 Neulen, Hans Werner. In the Skies of Europe. Ramsbury, Marlborough, UK: The Crowood Press, 2000. .

External links

The mock-up of Ca.313, in Swedish service
An article about this aeroplane
Another article, in Swedish
The B 16A - a Swedish bomber version
The T 16A - a Swedish torpedo bomber version
 Caproni Ca 313
 S 16A Caproni Ca 313
 B 16A - Caproni Ca 313 (1940-1943)

Ca.313
1930s Italian bomber aircraft
Aircraft first flown in 1939
1930s Italian military reconnaissance aircraft
Twin piston-engined tractor aircraft
Low-wing aircraft